The 2009 New South Wales Swifts season saw New South Wales Swifts play in the 2009 ANZ Championship. With a team coached by Julie Fitzgerald and captained by Catherine Cox, Swifts won only 2 of their 13 matches during the regular season and finished ninth.

Players

Player movements

Roster

Player milestones
In 2009 six players made their ANZ Championship debut for Swifts:
 Samantha May and Erin Bell made their debut in Round 1 against Canterbury Tactix.
 Jessica Mansell made her debut in Round 7 against Queensland Firebirds
 Amy Wild made her debut in Round 13 against Central Pulse
 Ashlee Mann and Courtney Tairi made their debut in  Round 14 against Southern Steel.

Pre-season
Swifts played in two pre-season tournaments. In February 2009 they played in the Queenstown Pre-Season Tournament, losing 58–53 to Northern Mystics in the final. In March 2009, Swifts played in and won the 2009 SOPA Cup, hosted by Netball New South Wales at the Sydney Olympic Park Sports Centre.

Regular season

Fixtures and results
Round 1

Round 2

Round 3

Round 4

Round 5

Round 6

Round 7

Round 8

Round 9
 received a bye.
Round 10

Round 11

Round 12

Round 13

Round 14

Final table

Award winners

Swifts awards

Gallery

References

New South Wales Swifts seasons
New South Wales Swifts